St. Bernard Parish is a parish in the U.S. state of Louisiana. The parish seat and largest community is Chalmette. The parish was formed in 1807. St. Bernard Parish is part of the New Orleans–Metairie metropolitan statistical area; the parish is located southeast of the city of New Orleans and comprises the Chandeleur Islands and Chandeleur Sound in the east.

St. Bernard was the fastest growing parish in Louisiana from 2010 to 2020, increasing from a population of 35,897 in the 2010 census to 43,764 in 2020. It remains at less than two-thirds of its 2000 population of 67,229, prior to Hurricane Katrina.

History

St. Bernard Parish contains a large community of Spanish descent. This linguistically isolated group eventually developed its own dialect. The  settled along , a relict distributary bayou of the Mississippi River. Saint Bernard, the patron saint of colonial governor , was used in documents to identify  the area.

St. Bernard Parish is also home to the earliest Filipino community in the United States, Saint Malo, Louisiana.

The chief historical attraction in St. Bernard Parish is the  Battlefield (part of Jean Lafitte National Historical Park and Preserve), at which the Battle of New Orleans took place on January 8, 1815, during the War of 1812. Many street names near the battlefield bear the names of the chief participants, or take a pirate theme, since the pirate Jean Lafitte was considered to be a hero in the battle. A high school, later elementary and now a middle school, was named in honor of Andrew Jackson, who was the commanding officer in charge of defending New Orleans against the British invasion.

In 1863, Abraham Lincoln mentioned St. Bernard Parish in the Emancipation Proclamation as an area not in rebellion against the Union during the Civil War.

From 1919 to 1969, the parish was effectively ruled as part of the fiefdom of Leander Perez, a local Democratic official in neighboring Plaquemines Parish.

1868 St. Bernard Parish Massacre

In 1868, St. Bernard Parish was home to one of the deadliest massacres in Louisiana history. The St. Bernard Parish massacre occurred during the Reconstruction era, days before the Presidential election of 1868. As black men gained the right to vote, white Democrats of the parish feared losing their majority. Armed groups mobilized to violently silence these recently emancipated voters to win the election in favor of Democrat Horatio Seymour over Republican Ulysses S. Grant. A Seymour victory meant the end of Reconstruction over the South and the return of Louisiana to home rule. Many freedmen were dragged from their homes and murdered. Others fled to the cane fields to hide from the perpetrators.

The use of violence to suppress Republican votes was successful. Grant only received one vote from St. Bernard Parish, despite having a Republican majority. The reported number of freedmen killed varies from 35 to 135; the number of whites killed was two (one was killed in an attempt to help the victims).

Great Mississippi River Flood of 1927

During the Great Mississippi Flood of 1927, New Orleans city and state leaders used dynamite to breach a levee at Caernarvon, 13 miles (19 km) below Canal Street, to save the city of New Orleans from flooding.  At the time, it was thought by New Orleans residents that the dynamiting saved the city, but historians now believe that the dynamiting was unnecessary due to major upstream levee breaks that relieved pressure on the New Orleans levees. The levee breach caused flooding and widespread destruction in most of Eastern St. Bernard Parish and parts of Plaquemines Parish. Residents were never adequately compensated for their losses.

Hurricane Katrina, 2005

On August 29, 2005, St. Bernard was devastated by Hurricane Katrina. The storm damaged virtually every structure in the parish. The eye of Katrina passed over the eastern portion of the parish, pushing a  storm surge into the Mississippi River Gulf Outlet ("MRGO"). This surge destroyed the parish levees. Almost the entire parish was flooded, with most areas left with between 5 and 15 feet of standing water. The water rose suddenly and violently, during a period which witnesses reported as no more than fifteen minutes. In many areas, houses were smashed or washed off their foundations by a storm surge higher than the roofs.

For more than two months after the storm, much of the parish remained without proper services, including electricity, water, and sewage. Parish President Henry "Junior" Rodriguez declared all of the parish's homes unlivable. Emergency Communities offered one reason for hope in the first year after Hurricane Katrina. In the parking lot of a destroyed off-track betting parlor, EC built the Made with Love Cafe and Grill, a free kitchen and community center serving 1500 meals per day. Made with Love, housed in a geodesic dome, also offered food and clothing distribution, and emotionally supportive volunteers. Upon leaving, EC has offered logistical support for the founding of a new long-term Community Center of St Bernard.

As of late November 2005, it was estimated that the Parish had some 7,000 full-time residents, with some 20,000 commuting to spend the day working, cleaning up, or salvaging in the parish and spending their nights elsewhere.  By mid-December some businesses had returned to the Parish, most notably the ExxonMobil plant in Chalmette and the Domino Sugar plant in Arabi, together with a handful of small local stores and businesses.

At the start of January 2006, it was estimated that some 8,000 people were living in the Parish. The H.O.P.E. Project, a collective of volunteer relief workers, founded itself in January 2006 in the empty shell of the Corinne Missionary Baptist Church in Violet, LA, providing the tools for rebuilding and community empowerment. Since June 2006, Camp Hope, located in Arabi, has been housing volunteers' assisting residents of St. Bernard Parish in their recovery from Hurricane Katrina. A grassroots organization, the St. Bernard Project, opened in March 2006. A fully volunteer-run organization funded by the United Way, they help residents get back into their homes by working on the houses, providing tools, support and where possible, funding.

As of October 2006, the population was estimated to be 25,489. After population losses due to Hurricane Katrina, the school was reopened for elementary grades for the 2006–2007 school year.

Hurricane Ida, 2021 
As of the landfall of Hurricane Ida on August 29, 2021, St. Bernard Parish has been experiencing heavy flooding. Two days before, local officials and weather experts advised citizens to prepare for the storm, warning that rainfall could reach at most 11 feet. St Bernard Parish President, Guy McInnis, stated he does not plan to issue a formal evacuation order.

Geography
It is the second largest parish in Louisiana by total area and has the largest percentage of area in water of any parish.

The parish of St. Bernard embraces numerous small islands. The parish is classed among the alluvial lands of the state. The ridges comprise the arable lands of the parish and have an area of 37,000 acres (150 km2). The principal streams are the Bayous Terre aux Boeufs and La Loutre. There are numerous smaller streams which are efficient drainage canals. The dominant tree species is bald cypress, of which the most valuable trees have been cut and processed.

Bodies of water
 Lake Borgne  (north)
 Mississippi River  (southwest)
 Gulf of Mexico  (east)

Major highways
  Louisiana Highway 39
  Louisiana Highway 46
  Louisiana Highway 47

Adjacent counties and parishes
 Hancock County, Mississippi (north)
 Harrison County, Mississippi (northeast)
 Orleans Parish (northwest)
 Plaquemines Parish (south)
 St. Tammany Parish (northwest)

National protected areas
 Breton National Wildlife Refuge (part)
 Jean Lafitte National Historical Park (part, in Chalmette)

State park
 St. Bernard State Park

Communities

There are no incorporated areas in St. Bernard Parish.

Census-designated places
 Arabi
 Chalmette (parish seat)
Delacroix
 Meraux
 Poydras
 Violet

Unincorporated communities
 Caernarvon
 Hopedale (La Chinche)
 Reggio (Bencheque)
 Saint Bernard
 Shell Beach
 Versailles 
 Verret

Ghost towns
 Alluvial City
 Fazendeville
 Proctorville
 St. Malo

Demographics

The 2019 American Community Survey determined 46,266 people and 15,005 households lived in the parish. At the 2020 census, there were 43,764 people, down from the prior census estimates yet up from 2010's 35,897 people. The racial and ethnic makeup of the parish was 69.4% non-Hispanic white, 23.3% Black and African American, 0.4% American Indian and Alaska Native, 2.5% Asian, 0.1% Native Hawaiian and other Pacific Islander, 2.0% some other race, and 2.4% from two or more races in 2019; an estimated 10.1% of the population were Hispanic and Latino American of any race in 2019. In 2020, the racial and ethnic composition was 52.93% non-Hispanic white, 25.98% Black or African American, 0.49% American Indian and Alaska Native, 2.22% Asian, 0.01% Pacific Islander, 4.63% two or more races, and 13.73% Hispanic and Latino American of any race, reflecting the trend of diversification in the U.S.

Of the population, 90.7% spoke English at home, 5.5% Spanish, 1.6% other Indo-European languages, 1.6% Asian and Pacific Islander languages, and 0.7% other languages in 2019.

Among the 15,005 households, the median age was 34.2. Approximately 73.2% of the population were aged 18 and older, 7.4% under 5 years of age, and 11.1% aged 65 and older. The parish population was spread out in 17,035 housing units and there was a home-ownership rate of 67.7% compared to 64.0% nationwide from 2015 to 2019. The median housing value was $151,300, and median gross rent was $951. There was a median household income of $44,661; males had a median income of $48,252 versus $33,302 for females. An estimated 26.2% of the parish lived at or below the poverty line.

Christianity was the parish's largest religion according to the Association of Religion Data Archives in 2020. Most of the religiously-affiliated population are members of the Roman Catholic Church via the Roman Catholic Archdiocese of New Orleans, with 14,439 adherents as of 2020. Historically common throughout the state, Baptists were the second-largest Christian group in the parish; Southern Baptists made up 1,012 members and National Missionary Baptists numbered 1,230. Non/inter-denominational Protestants spread among independent congregationalist, Bible, and United or Uniting churches numbered 900 in 2020 per the Association of Religion Data Archives.

Education
Public schools in the parish are operated by the St. Bernard Parish Public Schools school district.

Due to Hurricane Katrina (2005), the parish's 20 plus public schools were consolidated as one school, the St. Bernard Unified School, or SBUS. St. Bernard Unified School broke up into several different schools in the 2006–2007 school year.

The parish is served by Nunez Community College.

Additionally Delgado Community College states that its Sidney Collier Campus in East New Orleans is in proximity to St. Bernard Parish.

St. Bernard Parish also has only one Catholic school, Our Lady of Prompt Succor of the Roman Catholic Archdiocese of New Orleans. There is also one private Montessori school, Classique Academy.

Media
While St. Bernard is served mainly by New Orleans media sources, such as a local section of The Times-Picayune, the Parish does have multiple newspapers.  The St. Bernard Voice, established in 1890, serves as the official journal of the parish.  The St. Bernard News was established in 1967 and publishes weekly.

Formerly published newspapers that served the parish include the St. Bernard Eagle and the St. Bernard Weekly Eagle which published in the 1870s through 1884 in Arabi, Progress which published from Stock Landing (Arabi) in 1888–1889, St. Bernard Protector 1925–1926, and the St. Bernard Guide which published from 1982 to 1986.

Politics

Notable people
 Renato Beluche
 P. G. T. Beauregard
 Walter Boasso
 A. G. Crowe
 Chris Dier
 Albert Estopinal
 Frank Fernández Jr.
 Ray Garofalo
 Alcide "Yellow" Núñez
 Samuel B. Nunez, Jr.
 Kenneth L. Odinet Sr.
 Irvan "Puco" Pérez
 Leander Perez
 François Marie, Chevalier de Reggio
 Edward Ripoll
 Mitchell Robinson
 Junior Rodriguez
 Jean Saint Malo
 Elmer R. Tapper
 Jacques Villeré
 Norris Weese
 Tommy Wiseau

See also

 National Register of Historic Places listings in St. Bernard Parish, Louisiana

References

External links

 Official website of the St. Bernard's Parish Government
 Official website of the St. Bernard Parish Tourist Commission
 St. Bernard Chamber of Commerce
 Los Isleños Heritage and Cultural Society
 St.Bernard Project Official Website
 St. Bernard Project Wikipedia Page
 H.O.P.E. Project of Violet, Louisiana
 Post-Katrina cleanup and volunteer efforts
 "Hurricane Journal", Samantha Perez of St. Bernard Parish
 St Bernard Health Statistics, History, and Vital Information
 Chalmation.net St. Bernard Internet Portal
 St. Bernard Parish Net Online Guide to St. Bernard Parish
  Geology and Hurricane-Protection Strategies in the Greater New Orleans Area
 Engineering Geology of St. Bernard Parish, Louisiana
 Water Resources of St. Bernard Parish, Louisiana  United States Geological Survey

 
Saint Bernard Parish, Louisiana
Louisiana parishes on the Mississippi River
1807 establishments in the Territory of Orleans
Louisiana Isleño communities
Populated places established in 1807